The lists of aircraft are sorted in alphabetical order.

Further reading 
The following reference sources, among many others, have been used to compile this list:

See also
 List of most-produced aircraft
 List of aircraft type designators
 List of civil aircraft
 List of airliners by maximum takeoff weight
 List of Bushplanes
 List of light transport aircraft
 List of racing aircraft
 List of regional airliners
 List of STOL aircraft
 List of VTOL aircraft
 List of flying boats and floatplanes
 List of ground effect vehicles
 List of large aircraft

External links 
 Searchable database of aircraft
 FAA Aircraft Characteristics Database
 Aircraft Bluebook. Performance & Specifications